The 2015–16 Buffalo Beauts season was the first in franchise history and the National Women's Hockey League's inaugural season.

Regular season

Standings

Game log

|-  style="background:#fcc;"
| 1 || October 11 || Boston Pride || 1–4 || || McLaughlin || HarborCenter || 0–1–0 || 0 || 
|-  style="background:#fcc;"
| 2 || October 18 || Connecticut Whale || 2–5 || || McLaughlin || HarborCenter || 0–2–0 || 0 || 
|-  style="background:#fcc;"
| 3 || October 25 || Boston Pride || 3–5 || || McLaughlin || HarborCenter || 0–3–0 || 0 || 
|-  style="background:#fcc;"
| 4 || November 15 || Connecticut Whale || 2–3 || || Sass || HarborCenter || 0–4–0 || 0 || 
|-  style="background:#fff;"
| 5 || November 22 || Connecticut Whale || 6–7 || SO || Makela || HarborCenter || 0–4–1 || 1 || 
|-  style="background:#cfc;"
| 6 || November 29 || @ New York Riveters || 3–1 || || McLaughlin || Aviator Sports and Events Center || 1–4–1 || 3 || 
|-  style="background:#fcc;"
| 7 || December 5 || @ Boston Pride || 6–7 || || McLaughlin || Bright Hockey Center || 1–5–1 || 3 || 
|-  style="background:#fff;"
| 8 || December 6 || @ Connecticut Whale || 2–3 || SO || Makela || Chelsea Piers CT || 1–5–2 || 4 || 
|-  style="background:#fcc;"
| 9 || December 20 || @ Boston Pride || 0–1 || || McLaughlin || Bright Hockey Center || 1–6–2 || 4 || 
|-  style="background:#fcc;"
| 10 || December 27 || New York Riveters || 3–7 || || McLaughlin || HarborCenter || 1–7–2 || 4 || 
|-  style="background:#cfc;"
| 11 || January 3 || @ Boston Pride || 4–3 || OT || Makela || Bright Hockey Center || 2–7–2 || 6 || 
|-  style="background:#fcc;"
| 12 || January 10 || @ Connecticut Whale || 3–5 || || Makela || Chelsea Piers CT || 2–8–2 || 6 || 
|-  style="background:#cfc;"
| 13 || January 17 || @ New York Riveters || 6–5 || SO || Sass || Aviator Sports and Events Center || 3–8–2 || 8 || 
|-  style="background:#cfc;"
| 14 || January 31 || New York Riveters || 4–2 || || McLaughlin || HarborCenter || 4–8–2 || 10 || 
|-  style="background:#fff;"
| 15 || February 7 || @ Connecticut Whale || 2–3 || OT || McLaughlin || Chelsea Piers CT || 4–8–3 || 11 || 
|-  style="background:#fff;"
| 16 || February 14 || @ New York Riveters || 3–4 || SO || McLaughlin || Aviator Sports and Events Center || 4–8–4 || 12 || 
|-  style="background:#cfc;"
| 17 || February 21 || New York Riveters || 5–1 || || McLaughlin || HarborCenter || 5–8–4 || 14 || 
|-  style="background:#fcc;"
| 18 || February 28 || Boston Pride || 2–3 || || McLaughlin || HarborCenter || 5–9–4 || 14 || 
|-

|- style="text-align:center;"
|

Playoffs

Game log

|- style="background:#fcc;"
| 1 || March 4 || @ Connecticut Whale || 0–3 || || || Chelsea Piers CT || 0–1 || (No gamesheet available)
|- style="background:#cfc;"
| 2 || March 5 || @ Connecticut Whale || 4–1 || || || Chelsea Piers CT || 1–1 || (No gamesheet available)
|- style="background:#cfc;"
| 3 || March 6 || @ Connecticut Whale || 4–3 || || McLaughlin || Chelsea Piers CT || 2–1 || 
|-

|-  style="background:#fcc;"
| 1 || March 11 || Boston Pride || 3–4 || OT || McLaughlin || Prudential Center Practice Facility || 0–1 || 
|-  style="background:#fcc;"
| 2 || March 12 || Boston Pride || 1–3 || || McLaughlin || Prudential Center Practice Facility || 0–2 || 
|-

|- 
|

Statistics
Updated as of games played through March 6, 2016

Skaters

Goaltenders

Roster

|}

Awards and honors
NWHL Player of the Week
Kelley Steadman – Nov 23, 2015
Devon Skeats – Nov 30, 2015
Megan Bozek – Jan 3, 2016
Brianne McLaughlin – Jan 17, 2016
Kelley Steadman – Jan 31, 2016

NWHL 1st All-Star Game selection
Megan Bozek (Team Pfalzer)
Shelby Bram (Team Knight)
Meghan Duggan (Team Pfalzer)
Brianne McLaughlin (Team Knight)
Devon Skeats (Team Pfalzer)
Hayley Williams (Team Knight)

Transactions

Signings

Draft

The following were the Beauts selections in the 2015 NWHL Draft on June 20, 2015.

References

Games

Buffalo Beauts
2015–16 NWHL season by team
Buffalo Beauts
Buffalo Beauts